Yahyaabad-e Bala (also Romanized as Yahyáābād-e Bālā; also known as Yahyáābād and Yaḩyáābād-e ‘Olyā) is a village in Miyandasht Rural District, in the Central District of Kashan County, Isfahan Province, Iran. At the 2006 census, its population was 22, in 9 families.

References 

Populated places in Kashan County